Rachama (also known as Lachama Chuli) is a mountain peak in the Himalayas on the border of Nepal and Tibet Autonomous Region of China.

Location 
It is accessible through Simikot Airport, Humla district which is just 43 km south-west. 

Rachama and its surroundings are part of an extensive study on Little Ice Age glaciers. As of July 2017, six of them have been investigated and researched by scientists from Chinese Academy of Sciences.

References 

Karnali Province
Mountains of the Himalayas
Wikipedia requested photographs by location
Six-thousanders of the Himalayas
Mountains of Nepal